James Burkett Hartle (August 20, 1939) is an American physicist. He has been a professor of physics at the University of California, Santa Barbara since 1966, and he is currently a member of the external faculty of the Santa Fe Institute. Hartle is known for his work in general relativity, astrophysics, and interpretation of quantum mechanics.

Work
In collaboration with Murray Gell-Mann and others, Hartle developed an alternative to the standard Copenhagen interpretation, more general and appropriate to quantum cosmology, based on consistent histories.

With Dieter Brill in 1964, he discovered the Brill–Hartle geon, an approximate solution realizing Wheeler's suggestion of a hypothetical phenomenon in which a gravitational wave packet is confined to a compact region of spacetime by the gravitational attraction of its own field energy.

With Kip Thorne, Hartle derived from general relativity the laws of motion and precession of black holes and other relativistic bodies, including the influence of the coupling of their multipole moments to the spacetime curvature of nearby objects, as well as writing down the Hartle-Thorne metric, an approximate solution which describes the exterior of a slowly and rigidly rotating, stationary and axially symmetric body.

Working at the Enrico Fermi Institute at the University of Chicago in 1983, he developed the Hartle–Hawking wavefunction of the Universe in collaboration with Stephen Hawking. This specific solution to the Wheeler–deWitt equation is meant to explain the initial conditions of the Big Bang cosmology.

Hartle is the author of the textbook on general relativity entitled Gravity: an Introduction to Einstein's General Relativity.

Hartle was elected to the American Philosophical Society in 2016.

References

External links
James Hartle homepage
Faculty profile
"The Future of Gravity" – April, 2000 online lecture (RealAudio plus slides)
"Spacetime Quantum Mechanics" online RealAudio lecture
"The Classical Behavior of Quantum Universes" online RealAudio lecture

"The Quantum Universe: Essays on Quantum Mechanics, Quantum Cosmology, and Physics in General" book (World Scientific, 2021)

Living people
21st-century American physicists
American relativity theorists
American textbook writers
American male non-fiction writers
University of California, Santa Barbara faculty
Members of the United States National Academy of Sciences
1939 births
Santa Fe Institute people
Members of the American Philosophical Society
Fellows of the American Academy of Arts and Sciences
Fellows of the American Physical Society